Muhammad Okil Musalman is a Nepalese politician, who belongs to the Socialist Party of Nepal. In the 2008 Constituent Assembly election, he was elected from the Rupandehi-7 constituency, with 8,121 votes as Madhesi Janadhikar Forum candidate.

References

Living people
Madhesi Jana Adhikar Forum, Nepal politicians
Socialist Party of Nepal politicians
Year of birth missing (living people)
Members of the 1st Nepalese Constituent Assembly